Frank Howard Cann (November 14, 1863 – November 19, 1935) was an American football coach and college athletics instructor.  He served the second head football coach at New York University (NYU).  He held that position for the 1898 season leading the NYU Violets to a record of 1–3. In 1907, Cann was still at New York University as director of the Department of Physical Training and Athletics.

Cann died in New Rochelle, New York in 1935.  He had two sons who became accomplished sportsmen. Howard Cann was an Olympic shotputter and a long-time coach of the NYU men's basketball team, whereas Tedford Cann was a swimmer and a decorated World War I veteran.

Head coaching record

References

External links
 

1863 births
1935 deaths
NYU Violets football coaches
People from Danvers, Massachusetts
Sportspeople from Essex County, Massachusetts
Coaches of American football from Massachusetts